Alain-Fournier was the pseudonym of Henri-Alban Fournier (3 October 1886 – 22 September 1914), a French author and soldier. He was the author of a single novel, Le Grand Meaulnes (1913), which has been filmed twice and is considered a classic of French literature. The book is based partly on his childhood.

Biography
Alain-Fournier was born in La Chapelle-d'Angillon, in the Cher département, in central France, the son of a school teacher. He studied at the Lycée Lakanal in Sceaux, Hauts-de-Seine, near Paris, where he prepared for the entrance examination to the École Normale Supérieure, but without success. He then studied at the merchant marine school in Brest. At the Lycée Lakanal, he met Jacques Rivière, and the two became close friends. In 1909, Rivière married Alain-Fournier's younger sister Isabelle.

He interrupted his studies in 1907 and from 1908 to 1909 he performed his military service. At this time he published some essays, poems and stories which were later collected and re-published by the name Miracles.

Throughout this period he was contemplating what would become his celebrated novel, Le Grand Meaulnes. On the first of June 1905, Ascension day, while he was taking a stroll along banks of the Seine he met and spoke with Yvonne Marie Elise Toussaint de Quiévrecourt. He became enamoured, but it was not reciprocated. The next year on the same day he waited for her at the same place, but she did not appear. That night he told Rivière, "She did not come. And even if she had, she would not have been the same". They did not meet again until eight years later, when she was married with two children. Yvonne de Quiévrecourt would become Yvonne de Galais in his novel.

He returned to Paris in 1910 and became a literary critic, writing for the Paris-Journal. There he met André Gide and Paul Claudel. In 1912, he quit his job to become the personal assistant of the politician Casimir Perrier. Le Grand Meaulnes was finished in early 1913, and was published first in the Nouvelle Revue Française (from July to October 1913), and then as a book. Le Grand Meaulnes was nominated for, but did not win, the Prix Goncourt.  It is available in English in a widely admired 1959 translation by Frank Davison for Oxford University Press with the title The Lost Domain.

In 1914, Alain-Fournier started work on a second novel, Colombe Blanchet, but this remained unfinished when he joined the Army as a lieutenant during August. He died fighting near Vaux-lès-Palameix (Meuse) one month later, on 22 September 1914. His body remained unidentified until 1991, at which time he was buried in the cemetery of Saint-Remy-la-Calonne. According to some sources, the patrol which Alain-Fournier was part of received the order to "shoot at German soldiers encountered unexpectedly and who were stretcher-bearers"; the patrol obeyed, which the Germans would have considered a violation of international conventions.

Most of the writing of Alain-Fournier was published posthumously: Miracles (a volume of poems and essays) in 1924, his correspondence with Jacques Rivière in 1926 and his letters to his family in 1930. His notes and sketches for Colombe Blanchet have also been published.

Albin Schram manuscripts
A correspondence between Alain-Fournier and an unidentified woman was found in the Albin Schram Collection. It is a grateful letter for her introduction to Monsieur Hébrard and refers to his next work:

Il m'a proposé pour Le Temps ce qu'il était le plus logique de me proposer: lui apporter mon prochain roman – ce que j'ai promis bien volontiers. Ce second roman est, pour l'instant un peu retardé par une nouvelle oeuvre qui s'est mise au travers de ma route et qui ne me laisse pas beaucoup de répit. Mais j'espère bien avant la fin de l'année avoir terminé Colombe Blanchet.

He has proposed to me for Le Temps that which was the most logical thing to propose to me: to bring him my next novel – which I have promised quite willingly. This second novel is, for the moment, somewhat delayed by a new work which has placed itself across my path and which doesn't leave me much respite. But I hope well before the end of the year to have finished Colombe Blanchet.

AJRAF
In 1975, AJRAF – Association des amis de Jacques Rivière et d'Alain-Fournier (Association of the Friends of Jacques Rivière and of Alain-Fournier) was founded by Alain Rivière, the son of Jacques Rivière and nephew of Alain-Fournier to "promote knowledge of these two authors and to gather their friends together".

Works 
 Le Grand Meaulnes
 Colombe Blanchet (unfinished novel)
 Lettre au Petit B
 Miracles (poems)

Inspiration for artists
Alain-Fournier has inspired the artist Jean-Louis Berthod, from Albens, who carved in 2014 a lime wood board (130 cm × 140 cm) according to Le Grand Meaulnes.

See also
 Nançay and the Loire Valley, widely thought to be the inspiration for the setting for Le Grand Meaulnes
 Prix Alain-Fournier

References

External links

 Detailed biography of Alain-Fournier with many photographs of him, his family and his environment. 
AJRAF – Association des amis de Jacques Rivière et d'Alain-Fournier (Association of the Friends of Jacques Rivière and of Alain-Fournier) 
 A plot summary of Le Grand Meaulnes
 Campa, Laurence: Alain-Fournier, Henri, in: 1914–1918-online. International Encyclopedia of the First World War.
 
 
 
 

1886 births
1914 deaths
People from Cher (department)
20th-century French novelists
20th-century French male writers
Writers from Centre-Val de Loire
Lycée Louis-le-Grand alumni
Lycée Lakanal alumni
French military personnel killed in World War I
French male novelists
20th-century pseudonymous writers